Axiom Orbital Segment or Axiom Segment (or AxS) are the planned modular components of the International Space Station (ISS) designed by Axiom Space for commercial space activities. Axiom Space gained initial NASA approval for the venture in January 2020. Axiom Space was later awarded the contract by NASA on February 28, 2020. This orbital station will be separated from the ISS to become its own modular space station, Axiom Station, after the ISS is decommissioned.

Axiom Segment
At least four Axiom modules will attach to the International Space Station. The first module is scheduled to be launched in late 2025 and would dock to the forward port of Harmony, requiring relocation of Pressurized Mating Adapter (PMA-2) to any other ports on ISS like Harmony nadir. Axiom Space plans to attach at least three additional modules to its first core module, and send private astronauts to inhabit the modules.

Axiom renderings illustrate how the four modules might attach to the ISS as they are berthed and relocated by the Mobile Servicing System using Canadarm2.

Axiom Station 
The company released preliminary plans in February 2020 for how the Axiom Orbital Segment could form the basis for the Axiom Station, a potential future space station, constructed out of the Axiom Segment and additional elements upon ISS retirement and separation, including a power and thermal module with an airlock. The company plans to launch its first module to the ISS in 2025, with the second, third and fourth launching in 2026, 2027 and 2028 respectively.

The interior concept of the crew quarters of Axiom Orbital Segment was designed by French architect and designer Philippe Starck. Renderings of the habitat show a chamber with walls that are covered with tufted padding and studded with hundreds of color-changing LEDs. The Axiom Orbital Segment will have amenities including high-speed Wi-Fi, video screens, picture windows and a glass-walled cupola — which Axiom calls "the largest window observatory ever constructed for the space environment".

Each Axiom Station module is an independent spacecraft equipped with all the systems needed to maneuver in orbit - propulsion among them.

Planned modules

AxH1 
Axiom's first module, Hab One, is expected to launch in late 2025. It will provide quarters for four crew members and volume to accommodate research and manufacturing applications. Each personal crew quarter is equipped with a large Earth-viewing window and touch-screen comms panel. A docking adapter allows visiting vehicles to dock to the Axiom Station; four radial ports on the Hub provide for the addition of future modules and increase the station's docking capability. It will have propulsion, guidance, navigation and station control systems.

AxSEE-1 
Axiom Space plans to manufacture the SEE-1 module for the British company Space Entertainment Enterprise (or S.E.E.). It is planned to be a six meter spherical inflatable module and to fulfill the purpose of a first entertainment studio in space. SEE-1 is currently expected to launch after AxH1 arrives at the ISS.

The directors of SEE, Dmitry Lesnevsky and Elena Lesnevsky, have additionally been pursuing film shootings for a future movie with Tom Cruise at the station.

AxH2 
Axiom's Hab Two module is expected to launch in 2026. It will provide quarters for an additional four crew members allowing the station to support up to eight crew. It provides complete ECLSS support, commercial high data satellite communications and a Canadarm 3 styled Remote manipulator system for the Axiom Station.

AxRMF 
Axiom's Research & Manufacturing Facility module is expected to launch no earlier than 2026. It provides access to the unique microgravity environment as a platform to conduct innovative research, product development, process improvement, and manufacturing.

AxEO 
Axiom's Earth Observatory will be a glass-walled cupola planned to launch in 2026.

AxPT 
Axiom's Power Thermal module will provide power and thermal capacity equivalent to that of the ISS via solar array to support the station so that Axiom Station will be able to support itself once it disconnects from the ISS. It is expected to launch no earlier than 2027. Until AxPT is launched, Axiom Station will be relying on the ISS to help provide power. AxPT also adds EVA capability to the station.

AxPLM 
Leonardo may be used on Axiom Station after the ISS is decommissioned.

Construction

Manufacturing 
Axiom Space signed a contract with Thales Alenia Space for Thales Alenia to manufacture and test the primary structure and the Micrometeoroid & Debris Protection System (or MDPS) for both AxH1 and AxH2. Thales Alenia Space is already in the process of machining the primary structure of AxH1. With the completion of the Manufacturing Readiness Review on September 21, 2021, Thales Alenia was able to begin welding the cone panels of AxH1. The primary structure for AxH1 is expected to be delivered from Italy to Houston, TX in early 2023 where Axiom Space will complete assembly and integration of all systems before launch.

Assembly 
There have been no announcements as to which rocket will carry the AxS modules into Low Earth orbit. The first module, AxH1, is planned to attach onto the forward port of Harmony. The SEE-1 module is planned to berth on one of the radial ports of AxH1. AxH2 will then berth on the forward port of AxH1. AxPT is planned to berth on the Zenith port of either AxH1 or AxH2. As Axiom Station is a modular space station the modules may be moved to different ports as needed.

Purpose

Scientific research 
Axiom Station is planned to have a lab module, AxRMF, to provide opportunities for Low Earth orbit research and manufacturing.

Commercial station 
Axiom Station is also planned to have space for general commercial use, such as the SEE-1 entertainment module.

See also 
 Axiom Mission 1 -- precursor private crew mission
 
 
 
 
 List of commercial space stations
 
 Space tourism

References

External links 
 https://www.axiomspace.com/axiom-station

 proposed hotels
Axiom Station
 destination resorts
 space tourism
 components of the International Space Station
 Axiom Space